Mary I (1516–1558) was Queen of England and Ireland 1553–1558. 

Mary I may also refer to:
 Mary I, Countess of Menteith (13th century)
 Mary, Queen of Hungary (1371–1395)
 Mary, Duchess of Burgundy (1457–1482)
 Mary, Queen of Scots (1542–1587), Mary I of Scotland
 Maria I of Portugal (1734–1816)
 Mary Immaculate College or Mary I, a college in Limerick, Ireland
 Mary, mother of Jesus as Mary, Queen of Heaven

See also
Queen Mary (disambiguation)